The 26th Michigan Infantry Regiment was an infantry regiment that served in the Union Army during the American Civil War.

Service
The 26th Michigan Infantry was mustered into Federal service at Jackson, Michigan, on December 12, 1862. The regiment participated in the suppression of the New York Draft Riots in July, 1863.

The regiment was mustered out of service on June 4, 1865.

Total strength and casualties
The regiment suffered three officers and 115 enlisted men killed in action or mortally wounded and three officers and 159 enlisted men who died of disease, for a total of 280
fatalities.

Commanders
 Colonel Judson S. Farrar
 Colonel Henry Horatio Wells

See also
List of Michigan Civil War Units
Michigan in the American Civil War

Notes

References
The Civil War Archive

Units and formations of the Union Army from Michigan
1865 disestablishments in Michigan
1862 establishments in Michigan
Military units and formations established in 1862
Military units and formations disestablished in 1865